João Miguel Pinto da Silva ( Miguel; born August 3, 1973, in Porto Alegre, Rio Grande do Sul, Brazil) is a Brazilian footballer. He plays for the Hong Kong team Convoy Sun Hei.

External links

1973 births
Living people
Brazilian footballers
Brazilian expatriate footballers
Association football defenders
Sun Hei SC players
Hong Kong First Division League players
Expatriate footballers in Hong Kong
Brazilian expatriate sportspeople in Hong Kong
Footballers from Porto Alegre